The Hertfordshire Women's cricket team is the women's representative cricket team for the English historic county of Hertfordshire. They play their home games at various grounds across the county, including Knebworth Park, Knebworth and London Road, Tring. They are captained by Kezia Hassall. In 2019, they played in Division Three of the final season of the Women's County Championship, and in 2021 won the East Group of the Women's Twenty20 Cup. They are partnered with the regional side Sunrisers.

History

1935–2000: Early History
Hertfordshire Women played their first recorded match in 1935, against Civil Service Women. They went on to play various other matches throughout the 1940s and 1950s, including a match against a touring Australia side in 1951. In 1980, East Anglia Women, which included players from Hertfordshire, joined the Women's Area Championship.

2001– : Women's County Championship
Hertfordshire Women joined the Women's County Championship in 2001, replacing East Anglia Women, finishing 5th in Division Two in their first season. After being relegated in 2003, they played in the County Challenge Cup, the tier below the County Championship, for the next four seasons. Returning to the Championship proper in 2008, Hertfordshire have since played in the lower divisions of the structure, achieving their best performance in 2016, when they won Division Four North & East.

In the Women's Twenty20 Cup, which they joined for its inaugural season in 2009, Hertfordshire have fared similarly, playing mostly in Division 3. In 2012, they had a chance at promotion from South Division 2, but lost to Essex in the Division final, whilst they finished 2nd in Division 3C in 2017, with six wins from eight games. In 2020, after the county season was cancelled due to the COVID-19 pandemic, Hertfordshire competed in the East of England Championship, and won the 45-over competition. In 2021, they won the East Group of the Twenty20 Cup, going unbeaten with 5 victories and 3 matches abandoned due to rain. They also again competed in the East of England Championship, finishing second in the 45-over competition to Buckinghamshire. They finished second in their group of the 2022 Women's Twenty20 Cup, and again finished second in the East of England Championship.

Players

Current squad
Based on appearances in the 2022 season.

Notable players
Players who have played for Hertfordshire and played internationally are listed below, in order of first international appearance (given in brackets):

 Sian Ruck (2009)

Seasons

Women's County Championship

Women's Twenty20 Cup

Honours
 Women's Twenty20 Cup:
 Group winners (1) – 2021

See also
 Hertfordshire County Cricket Club
 Sunrisers (women's cricket)

Notes

References

Cricket in Hertfordshire
Women's cricket teams in England